All Saints Church, officially All Saints with Holy Trinity is the Church of England parish church of the town of Loughborough, Leicestershire within the Diocese of Leicester.

History 
The church dates from the 14th century; the tower from the 15th century. It is located on a slight rise within the old town and is probably the site of a pre-Christian place of worship. All Saints is one of the largest parish churches in England, which is an indication of the importance of Loughborough in the mediaeval wool trade. Loughborough Grammar School was likely founded by a priest at the church c. 1496, paid for in the will of local wool merchant Thomas Burton, and the school was housed within the church grounds until it moved away to its purpose-built campus in 1850. The hymn composer G. W. Briggs (himself an Old Loughburian) was rector of All Saints from 1918 to 1934.

Next door is the Old Rectory, originally a mediaeval manor house, the earliest record of which is 1228. It was mostly demolished before it was recognised that large parts of the mediaeval house remained. It now contains a museum which is open on summer Saturdays.

The postcode for the church is LE11 1UX, and its official address is on Rectory Road. However, the main entrance leads onto Steeple Row and Church Gate, the latter a mediaeval street that connects the old town and the church to the modern town centre (Market Place), though now devoid of mediaeval buildings is of mediaeval width and now partially pedestrianised.

List of rectors

 Richard de Dalham, Dean of Lichfield 1193 – 1214
 Robert de Verdon 1215 – 1227
 Thomas de Turville 1227 – 1244
 Thomas de Torp 1244 – 1280 x 1286
 ? 1280 x 1286 – 1315
 Thomas de Stanton 1315 – 1321
 John de Denton 1321 – 1325
 John Whitstone 1325 – 1348
 John Leeke 1349 – 1353
 Robert de Hull de Segrave 1353 – 1358
 John Leeke 1358 – 1369 (again)
 Richard Bokelly 1369 – 1375
 John de Campeden 1375 – 1381
 Thomas Wroxton 1381 – 1408
 John Southam 1408 – 1416
 Thomas Henkeston 1416 – 1419
 Robert Fry 1419 – 1435
 Thomas Loughborough 1435 – 1450
 John Auncell 1450 – 1452
 John Trypp 1452 – 1454
 Henry Greene 1454 – 1473
 John Fisher 1473 – 1494
 Simon Tavenour 1494 – 1500
 Richard Lavender 1500 – 1508
 Robert Blackwall 1508 – 1509
 Geoffrey Wren  1509 – 1527
 Robert Fabyan alias Clerke 1527 – 1533
 Thomas Adeson 1533 – 1540
 Peter Ashton 1540 – 1548
 John Willock 1548 – 1554 (ejected)
 Arthur Lowe 1554 – 1559 (ejected)
 John Willock 1559 – 1585 (restored)
 John Browne, sr 1586 – 1616
 John Browne, jr 1616 – 1643
 Nicholas Hall 1643 – 1647 (ejected)
 Oliver Bromskill 1647 – 1662 (ejected) Bromskill was appointed by the Leicestershire Parliamentary committee during the imposition of a Presbyterian polity and removed during the Great Ejection.
 Nicholas Hall 1662 – 1669 (restored)
 George Bright 1669 – 1696
 John Alleyne 1696 – 1739
 Thomas Alleyne 1739 – 1761
 James Bickham 1761 – 1785
 Samuel Blackall 1786 – 1792
 Francis Wilcox 1792 – 1798
 Richard Hardy 1798 – 1826
 William Holme 1826 – 1848
 Henry Fearon 1848 – 1885 (also Archdeacon of Leicester 1863 – 1885)
 Thomas Pitts 1885 – 1917
 George Wallace Briggs 1918 – 1934
 William John Lyon 1934 – 1958
 Ronald Albert Jones 1959 – 1976
 Leonard George Edward Hancock 1976 – 1993
 Stephen Arthur Cherry 1994 – 2006 (now Dean of Kings College Cambridge)
 Rachel Anne Ross 2008 – 2014
 Wendy Dalrymple 2015 – present

Organisation 
All Saints is the official seat of the Archdeacon of Loughborough, previously The Venerable Paul Hackwood, who nevertheless normally resides at St Peter's, Glenfield in Leicester. The Archdeacon oversees the 6 deaneries in Western Leicestershire which are named after ancient hundreds; Akeley East (Loughborough), Akeley South (Coalville), Akeley West (Ashby-de-la-Zouch), Guthlaxton, Sparkenhoe West (Hinckley and Market Bosworth) and Sparkenhoe East.

All Saints is the more traditional one of the two main Anglican churches in Loughborough, the other being Emmanuel Church (1835), which is Evangelical and frequented by many Loughborough University students. Emmanuel has St Mary's, Nanpantan as a sister-church. In Loughborough, there is also The Good Shepherd Church in Shelthorpe and All Saints Thorpe Acre with Dishley.

The Akeley East deanery is headed by a rural dean, The Reverend Wendy Dalrymple, rector of this parish.

Bells 
The tower contains a ring of ten bells hung for change ringing with a tenor weighing  in Db. The present peal were cast between 1897 and 1899 at the John Taylor Bellfoundry in Loughborough., whose foundry was less than a mile away. The largest four bells are lost wax castings and have intricate patterns cast on to the waist of the bells.

Music

Director of Mission through Music
 Emma Trounson, B.A. University of Bristol, M.A. Royal Welsh College of Music and Drama, Cardiff : 2019–Present

Musical ensembles
  Adult choir
  Children's choir
  All-Age Music Group
  Contemporary Collective
  Taize Musicians

Organ
The church contains a 2-manual pipe organ. It was installed in 1966 by Henry Willis. It uses much pipework from a redundant organ from Bridgway Hall in Nottingham. A specification of the organ can be found on the National Pipe Organ Register.

Organists
 John Baptist Cramer 1838–1877
 Dr. Charles Hage Briggs 1878 - 1902
 R. T. Bedford 1903–1917
 C. Milton-Bill 1917–1919 (afterwards organist of Holy Trinity Church, Swansea).
 Miss Rigg 1920– ????
 Albert Ernest Barton Hart 1924–1960s
 David Briers 1970s
 Dr. Peter J. Underwood, M.A. [Downing, Cambridge], M.Mus. [London], Ph.D. [Birmingham], FRCO (CHM), FTCL, LRAM, ARCM, ADCM: 1985–2017
 David Cowen, M.A. [St Peter's, Oxford], FRCO, LRSM, DipNSC: 2017–2018 (Acting)
 Simon Headley, B.A. [University of Central England], ARCO: (principal organist) 2019–Present

External links 
 All Saints Church
 Diocese of Leicester
 Church of England
 Photographs of the interior of the church

References

Loughborough
Loughborough
All Saints Church